Afghanistan competed at the 1996 Summer Olympics in Atlanta. The Central Asian nation returned to the Olympic Games after missing the 1992 Summer Olympics held in Barcelona.

Afghanistan only sent two representatives to the Atlanta Games, but light-middleweight boxer Mohammad Jawid Aman was disqualified after arriving at the Games when he was too late for the weigh-in. The other participant, marathon runner Abdul Baser Wasiqi, injured his hamstring prior to the race. Nevertheless, he took part in the marathon but finished last, more than two hours after the winner.

Athletics

See also
 Afghanistan at the 1996 Summer Paralympics

References

Nations at the 1996 Summer Olympics
1996 
1996 in Afghan sport